The Nawabs of Dhanbari were a Bengali aristocratic family of feudal landowners. The zamindari estate encompassed parts of the Tangail District, particularly around Dhanbari. Although their aristocratic status was lost with the East Bengal State Acquisition and Tenancy Act of 1950, the Dhanbari estate remains an important part of the history of Tangail and tourist attraction.

Location
The family is based in the town of Dhanbari, which is presently in Dhanbari Upazila of northern Bangladesh's Tangail District.

History
The family claim to be a descendant of Shah Atiqullah, a Muslim preacher from Baghdad, who had migrated to Delhi in the Mughal period. However, historian Muhammad Mojlum Khan argues that "there is no conclusive evidence" of the family's descent from Shah Atiqullah. A certain Shah Sultan from this family migrated to Bengal.

The title of Nawab was granted to Shah Khoda Bakhsh of this family, making him the feudal landowner of Dhanbari and surrounding areas. He married his only daughter, Talebunnisa, to Raza Ali Khan, another Zamindar based in Tangail and the son of Ekabar Ali Khan.

Bakhsh was succeeded by his son, Nawab Syed Muhammad Shah, who was granted the title of Chowdhury. His wife Syedani Karimunnesa became the owner of Zamindari in course of circumstances. They were succeeded by their son, Nawab Janab Ali Chowdhury. He married the daughter of Muhammad Ali Khan Chowdhury, the Zamindar of Natore. He died at the age of 28, leaving a son and a daughter (Sarah Khatun-Chowdhurani).

The next son, Syed Nawab Ali Chowdhury, married Altafunnesa Chowdhurani, daughter of Nawab Abdus Sobhan Chowdhury, the Zamindar of Bogra. After the death of Altafunnesa, Nawab Ali married Syedani Shahida Akter Khatun, a descendant of Baro-Bhuiyan chief Isa Khan. Thirdly, he married Syedani Sakina Khatun Chowdhurani, another daughter of Nawab Abdus Sobhan Chowdhury. Syed Nawab Ali Chowdhury had two sons and two daughters:
 Syed Faizul Bari Altaf-ul Ali Chowdhury : He had 4 sons & 2 daughters:
 Syed Muhammad Ali Chowdhury
 Syed Ahmad Ali Chowdhury
 Syed Hamed Ali Chowdhury
 Syed Mahmud Ali Chowdhury
 Syedani Umme Fatima Zahera Khatun : She married Lt. Muhammad Hossain of Delduar Zamindar House.
 Syed Hasan Ali Chowdhury : He married Razia Khatun, daughter of Barrister Ashraf Ali Chowdhury (Ashraf Ali was the son of Zamindar Ershad Ali Chowdhury and grandson of Nabab Abdus Sobhan Chowdhury).
 Syedani Umme Fatima Humera Khatun: She married Muzaffar-ul Masvi (nephew of Wajed Ali Khan Panni, Zamindar of Karatia).
 Mohammed Haider Ali Khan Panni (Son of Syedani Umme Fatima Humera Khatun & Grandson of Syed Nawab Ali Chowdhury)
 Mehedi Ali Khan Panni
 Muhammad Bayazeed Khan Panni
 Khurram Khan Panni (cousin of Muhammad Bayazeed Khan Panni)

See also 
 Mohammad Ali Bogra
 Syed Nawab Ali Chowdhury

References 

Mughal Empire
Bengali families